Close Your Eyes is the third and final full-length studio album by Glorium. It was recorded in singer's Paul Streckfus's attic in the summer of 1997. Only 40 CDs were ever made. Grant Barger (Palace Music, The For Carnation) engineered.

Track listing
 "Heavy FM Damage" – 4:07 
 "Us + The Bad Past" – 3:34 
 "Mnemonic Me" – 3:50
 "Doomsday Kiss" – 4:20 
 "The Spiral Moat"+ – 3:04 
 "Moonbeam King" – 3:50
 "White Noise, Black Road" – 1:24
 "Having The Devil On Your Side" – 4:08
 "Ape-men At Sea" – 4:53
 "5+20" – 2:52
 "Skeleton Keyring" – 1:15
 "Hold Still" – 6:00

Personnel
George Lara – bass
Juan Miguel Ramos – drums
Ernest Salaz – guitar, vocals
Lino Max – guitar, vocals
Paul Streckfus – vocals
 + Malcom Hamilton – synthesizers
 Glorium, Grant Barger – producer

References

External links
 Glorium Bandcamp page for Close Your Eyes

Glorium albums
1997 albums